Spruce Grove-St. Albert was a provincial electoral district in Alberta, Canada, mandated to return a single member to the Legislative Assembly of Alberta under the first past the post voting system from 2012 to 2019.

History
The electoral district was created in the 2010 electoral boundary re-distribution from the electoral old district of Spruce Grove-Sturgeon-St. Albert. A large portion of land was moved into Barrhead-Morinville-Westlock that was north of Township Road 552 and Alexander First Nation as well as land lying east of the Reserve.

Boundary history

Representation history

Legislature results

2012 general election

2015 general election

Senate nominee results

2012 Senate nominee election district results

Student vote results

2012 election

See also
List of Alberta provincial electoral districts

References

External links
Elections Alberta
The Legislative Assembly of Alberta

Former provincial electoral districts of Alberta
Politics of St. Albert, Alberta
Spruce Grove